Court justice may refer to:

 Court Justice (TV series), an Australian TV show
 Court Justice: Sydney, an Australian TV show
 Judge, in some courts called a justice, one who presides over a court of law

See also

 , for various justices
 , for various justices
 
 Court of Justice (disambiguation)
 Justice (disambiguation)
 Court (disambiguation)